Sir Ernest Albert Waterlow,    (24 May 185025 October 1919) was a British painter.

Biography
Waterlow was born in London, and received the main part of his art education in the Royal Academy schools, where, in 1873, he gained the Turner medal for landscape-painting. Sir Sydney Waterlow was his uncle.

He was elected associate of the Royal Watercolour Society in 1880, member in 1894, and president in 1897; associate of the Royal Academy in 1890, and academician in 1903.

He began to exhibit in 1872 and produced a considerable number of admirable landscapes, in oil and watercolour, handled with grace and distinction. One of his pictures, Galway Gossips, is in the Tate collection.

He was knighted in the 1902 Coronation Honours, receiving the accolade from King Edward VII at Buckingham Palace on 24 October that year.

Waterlow died in Hampstead in 1919.

Further reading
C. H. Collins Baker, Sir E. A. Waterlow, R.A., P.R.W.S. (London: Art Journal Office, 1906).

References

External links
 
 

1850 births
1919 deaths
Knights Bachelor
Royal Academicians
19th-century English painters
English male painters
20th-century English painters
Landscape artists
Artists' Rifles soldiers
Members of the Royal Institute of Oil Painters
20th-century English male artists
19th-century English male artists